Jean "Jeannot" Ragnotti (born 29 August 1945 in Pernes-les-Fontaines, Vaucluse), is a French former rally driver for Renault in the World Rally Championship.

Ranking among his achievements are his conquering of the Monte Carlo Rally in 1981, what was the first turbo victory in the history of the WRC, alongside compatriot Jean-Marc Andrié against the might of the ultimate four-wheel-drive upstart, the Audi Quattro. In the following season, he took his Renault 5 Turbo to victory at the Tour de Corse. Jean Marc Andrie later committed suicide in 1999. The Maxi version of the same Renault 5 was to reign again on the asphalt stages of European rallying, when in 1985, Ragnotti claimed the Tour de Corse again with Group B rallying at its zenith; a win that came on debut of Renault 5 Maxi Turbo. His co-driver by that time was Pierre Thimonier (whose son Gilles would also be a co-driver for Jean Ragnotti). Pierre Thimonier died of cancer in 2008. The 1985 Rothmans Tour de Corse would also prove to be a tragic affair after the fatal crash of Attilio Bettega on SS4 (Zerubia) of the event.

In the 1990s, Ragnotti continued to drive for Renault, this time in their front-wheel drive Clio Maxi.

WRC victories

Complete 24 Hours of Le Mans results

References 

1945 births
Living people
Sportspeople from Vaucluse
French rally drivers
World Rally Championship drivers
24 Hours of Le Mans drivers
French people of Italian descent
World Sportscar Championship drivers